Kioumars Ghereghlou is the current curator for Middle East Collections at Stanford University, since September 2021. He is a historian, librarian and instructor by education. He priorly functioned as Bibliographic Assistant at Columbia University Libraries. From 2011 to 2017 he worked as Associate Research Scholar at the Center for Iranian Studies at Columbia University.

Ghereghlou acquired his BA in Iranian/Persian Languages and Literatures from the Ferdowsi University of Mashhad in 2000, and his MA and PhD in History from Shahid Beheshti University in Tehran in 2006. He also obtained a MLIS from Rutgers University–New Brunswick in 2021.

Selected publications
A selection of Ghereghlou's work:

References

Living people
Year of birth missing (living people)
Stanford University faculty
Iranian librarians
20th-century Iranian historians
Columbia University faculty
Columbia University librarians
Rutgers University alumni
Iranologists
Ferdowsi University of Mashad alumni
Shahid Beheshti University alumni